Thomas Barth (born 12 February 1960) is a German former cyclist. He competed for East Germany in the individual road race event at the 1980 Summer Olympics.

References

External links
 

1960 births
Living people
People from Zeulenroda-Triebes
People from Bezirk Gera
East German male cyclists
Cyclists from Thuringia
Olympic cyclists of East Germany
Cyclists at the 1980 Summer Olympics
Presidential Cycling Tour of Turkey winners